A rimshot is a percussion technique used to produce an accented snare drum backbeat.

Rimshot can also mean:

 Sting (percussion), a short sequence played by a drummer to punctuate a joke
 Rimshot (broadcasting), a radio or television station that attempts to reach a larger media market from a distant location
 Rimshot (basketball), a shot in which the ball hits the rim of the basket
 The Rimshots, an American funk and disco band